St. Valentin (also referred to as Sankt Valentin) is the most westerly town in the district of Amstetten in Lower Austria in Austria.

Population

References 

Cities and towns in Amstetten District